Ramanthapur Lake, also known as Pedda Cheruvu, is a lake located in Ramanthapur, Hyderabad. It is one of the largest lakes in Hyderabad. 'Pedda Cheruvu' means 'Large Lake' in Telugu language.

References

Lakes of Hyderabad, India